Fredrika Stenhammar (née Andrée; 19 September 1836 in Visby – 7 October 1880) was a Swedish opera singer (soprano). 

She was born as Fredrika Andrée to doctor Andreas Andrée and was sister of Sweden's first female organist, Elfrida Andrée. She was a student at the Conservatory in Leipzig in 1851–54, was employed at the Hofoper in Dessau in 185-55, and at the Royal Swedish Opera in 1855–57. She was a student of Gilbert Duprez in 1857–58 and sang at the opera in Vienna in 1859.  When she returned to Sweden she became a prima donna and a singing instructor of the Royal Swedish Opera. She was inducted to the Royal Swedish Academy of Music in 1864. She married the opera singer Oskar Fredrik Stenhammar (1834–1884).

References 
 Österberg, Carin et al., Svenska kvinnor: föregångare, nyskapare. Lund: Signum 1990.

Further reading 
  

1836 births
1880 deaths
Swedish operatic sopranos
Voice teachers
19th-century Swedish women opera singers
Women music educators